John Lambe (c. 1545–1628) was English astrologer and adviser to George Villiers, 1st Duke of Buckingham.

John Lambe may also refer to:
Sir John Lambe (Dean of the Arches) (1566?–1647), English cleric
John Lambe (M5 rapist) (born 1944), English serial rapist between 1975 and 1980
John Lambe (priest) (1649–1708)

See also
John Lamb (disambiguation)